The 9th Beijing College Student Film Festival was held from 22 April to 26 May 2002 in Beijing, China.

Awards
 Best Film Award: The Dream of a Young Soldier
 Best Director Award: Huang Jianxin for Who Cares
 Best Actor Award: Fu Biao for Escort
 Best Actress Award: Hu Ke for Chat
 Best Visual Effects Award: Charging Out Amazon, Big Shot's Funeral
 Best Newcomer Award: Huang Haibo for he Dream of a Young Soldier
 Best First Film Award: Lu Chuan for The Missing Gun
 Favorite Film Award: Spring Subway
 Favorite Actor: Ge You for Big Shot's Funeral
 Favorite Actress Award: Xu Jinglei for Spring Subway
 Artistic Exploration Award: Zhang Yang for Quitting
 Grand Prix Award: A Young Prisoner's Revenge, Chat
 Committee Special Award: Purple Sunset, Bright Star
 Special Award for Comedy: Huang Hong for 25 Kids and a Dad
 Outstanding Contribution to Chinese Cinema Award: Xie Jin

References

External links
 9th Beijing College Student Film Festival Sina

Beijing College Student Film Festival
2002 film festivals
2002 festivals in Asia
Bei